Usability testing methods aim to evaluate the ease of use of a software product by its users. As existing methods are subjective and open to interpretation, scholars have been studying the efficacy of each method 

and their adequacy to different subjects, comparing which one may be the most appropriate in fields like e-learning,

e-commerce,
or mobile applications.

See also 
 Usability inspection
 Partial concurrent thinking aloud

References

External links 
 Exploring two methods of usability testing: concurrent versus retrospective think-aloud protocols

Usability
Human–computer interaction
Computing comparisons